Žigić is a surname. Notable people with the surname include:

 Nikola Žigić, Serbian footballer
 Sandra Žigić, Croatian footballer
 Zoran Žigić, Bosnian Serb military leader

Serbian surnames
Croatian surnames
Slavic-language surnames
Patronymic surnames